Victor Rabinowitz (July 2, 1911 – November 16, 2007) was a 20th-century American lawyer known for representing high-profile dissidents and causes.

Background

Rabinowitz was born in Brooklyn, New York, to Rose (née Netter) and Louis M. Rabinowitz, a factory owner who had emigrated from Lithuania. He graduated from the University of Michigan with a BA in 1931 and University of Michigan Law School with a JD in 1934.

Career

Rabinowitz, Boudin

Rabinowitz was hired right out of law school by the progressive law firm Hays, Podell and Shulmman. Rabinowitz was a law clerk at Hays, Podell until mid-1938, when Rabinowitz followed Hays, Podell junior partner, the leftist Ben Algase, into the firm of Louis B. Boudin, a labor lawyer, active in "radical politics."

In 1944, he formed a new firm with Boudin's nephew Leonard Boudin:  Rabinowitz and Boudin, currently Rabinowitz, Boudin, Standard, Krinsky & Lieberman, in New York City.  Rabinowitz and Boudin were the senior partners, joined by Michael Standard, Michael Krinsky, and Eric Lieberman. (Krinsky and Lieberman remain senior attorneys to the present.)  The firm's papers, held by the Tamiment Library of New York University, describes it as follows:   The firm represented numerous labor unions, most notably the American Communications Association, and assisted clients in passport cases, loss of employment and other legal matters arising from the targeting of individuals in government security investigations. The firm has been deeply involved in civil rights work and, during the Vietnam War, successfully defended, on First Amendment grounds, some of the leading opponents of the war, as well as draft resisters and conscientious objectors.    Clients included: Julian Bond, Paul Robeson, Alger Hiss, Benjamin Spock, Daniel Ellsberg, Dashiell Hammett, the Church of Scientology, and Jimmy Hoffa.  It has also represented the government of Chile under Salvador Allende, and the Cuban government since June 1960 and has been Cuba's only U.S. legal counsel in all U.S.-related matters.  Other clients included: Rockwell Kent, other unions, the Fellowship of Reconciliation, and other non-union organizations.

In November 1947, Rabinowitz ran as American Labor Party candidate against Republican candidate Jacob P. Lefkowitz and Democratic/Liberal Party of New York candidate Abraham J. Multer for the Fourteenth Congressional District of New York, caused by the resignation of Leo F. Rayfiel (appointed as a United States district judge).

In 1951, Rabinowitz joined more than half a dozen other lawyers in defending 17 Communist Party members, including Elizabeth Gurley Flynn.  The communists were accused of charged conspiring to "teach and advocate violent overthrow" of the government.  The other lawyers were: Abraham L. Pomerantz, Carol Weiss King, Michael Begun, Harold I. Cammer, Mary Kaufman, Leonard Boudin, and Abraham Unger.  Later, they were relieved by O. John Rogge, gangster Frank Costello's lawyer George Wolf, William W. Kleinman, Joseph L. Delaney, Frank Serri, Osmond K. Fraenkel, Henry G. Singer, Abraham J. Gellinoff, Raphael P. Koenig, and Nicholas Atlas.

Rabinowitz argued many cases before the United States Supreme Court.

In 1963, when daughter Joni Rabinowitz was convicted of perjury regarding work for the Student Nonviolent Coordinating Committee, he won her release on the grounds that the jury under-represented a local black population.

In 1984, he played an "important role in anchoring the defense" when Kathy Boudin, Weather Underground member and Leonard Boudin's daughter, pled guilty to murder as part of armored truck robbery.

Associations

Rabinowitz helped found the National Lawyers Guild in 1937 and served as its national president from 1967 to 1970.

From 1942 until the early 1960s, he was a member of the American Communist Party (CPUSA).

During the 1940s, he was active in the American Labor Party (ALP) and ran for office on their ticket.

Personal life and death

Rabinowitz was married twice, first to the former Marcia Goldberg of Brooklyn, New York, and following their divorce in 1967, he married filmmaker, journalist and author Joanne Grant Rabinowitz (1930–2005).

He died at his Manhattan home on November 16, 2007.

Legacy

Rabinowitz was a prominent figure in the civil rights and civil liberties eras.

He chaired the Louis M. Rabinowitz Foundation for his father. A 1967 file from the Federal Bureau of Investigation showed that it supported Civil Rights leader Floyd McKissick.

Works

 Unrepentant Leftist (1996)

See also

Family:
 Louis M. Rabinowitz

Associates:
 Louis B. Boudin
 Leonard Boudin

Clients:
 Salvador Allende
 Julian Bond 
 Kathy Boudin
 Daniel Ellsberg 
 Dashiell Hammett
 Alger Hiss 
 Jimmy Hoffa
 Rockwell Kent
 Paul Robeson 
 Benjamin Spock 
 American Communications Association
 Fellowship of Reconciliation
 Church of Scientology

References

External links 
 Victor Rabinowitz Papers at Tamiment Library and Robert F. Wagner Labor Archives at New York University Special Collections.

Further reading

 Review of Rabinowitz' autobiography by John Mage of "Monthly Review"

New York (state) lawyers
American civil rights lawyers
People from Brooklyn
American communists
20th-century American Jews
American people of Lithuanian-Jewish descent
1911 births
2007 deaths
University of Michigan Law School alumni
Activists from New York (state)
21st-century American Jews